Kandal is a small village located along the west side of the lake Breimsvatnet, about  southeast of the municipal center of Sandane in the municipality of Gloppen in Vestland county, Norway.

Surrounded by high mountains, the main industry in Kandal is goat farming. There are two mountain dairy farms in Kandal: Myklandsstøylen and Nesstøylen.  In the summer, most of the people take their animals up there to graze them and milk them.

References

Villages in Vestland
Stryn